BBCU Football Club, known fully as Big Bang Chula United Football Club, is a defunct Thai professional football club based in Bangkok, Thailand, owned by Montri Suwannoi. Founded as "Bangtoey Football Team" in 1976, the club changed its name many times, until finally, it became "BBCU" in 2011.

BBCU was one of the most successful Thai football clubs of the late 1990s (under the name of "Sinthana Football Club"). The club has won a Thai League 1 title, 2 Kor Royal Cups and 1 FA Cup. Moreover, during the years in lower divisions, the club has also won a Division 2 title.

History

Chulalongkorn University FC is the club based at Chulalongkorn University in Bangkok, Thailand. They have played in the Chula–Thammasat Traditional Football Match since 1934.

In 2004, Chulalongkorn University FC was combined with Sinthana FC (Chula-Sinthana FC) and played in Division 2 in 2005 until Chula-Sinthana FC was promoted from Division 1 to Thai Premier League in 2008.

In August of the 2008 season, they changed their club name again from "Chula-Sinthana FC" to "Chula United". The Club Director was Kasiti Kamalanavin.

Chula's return to the top flight, 2008 Thailand Premier League, ended with them finishing in a creditable 8th position. However they could not build on their first season and were relegated from the 2009 Thai Premier League.

Despite having two of the three top goalscorers in the 2010 Thai Division 1 League, Chula could not bounce back at the first attempt and slumped to a disappointing 10th-placed finish. Chula's striker Chainarong Tathong topped the 2010 Thai Division 1 League goalscoring chart with an impressive 19 goals. Fellow front man Aron da Silva netted 15 times to be the 3rd top scorer in the league.

In January 2011, the club changed their name to Big Bang Chulalongkorn University FC and relocated to play their home games at the Thai Army Sports Stadium on Vibhavadi Rangsit Road. The club got off to a flying start and won promotion even though they stuttered in the latter weeks of the season.

The club's venture in the 2012 Thai Premier League ended with them being relegated after only one season. Home games were played at the sparsely filled 65,000 Rajamangala Stadium with an average home attendance of only 939.

In April 2017, the club was dissolved, citing lack of fund as the reason. This team is automatically banned 2 years, If the team decide to come back they will relegated to the lowest tier of professional league.

Stadium
BBCU have used various stadiums throughout their history:

2012 : Rajamangala Stadium
2013 : Thai Army Sports Stadium
2014 – 2017 : Nonthaburi Youth Centre Stadium, Nonthaburi

Stadium and locations

Season by season record

Amateur years (1976–1987)
Since Bangtoey Football team was founded in 1976 to compete in Bangkapi Cup tournament, the club had played 11 more years in amateur level before joining the first Football Association of Thailand's competitions season in Ngor Royal Cup 1998.

Royal Cups' years (1988–1995)

Football League years (1996–2010)

Season by season domestic record (2011–present) 
(BBCU F.C.)

P = Played
W = Games won
D = Games drawn
L = Games lost
F = Goals for
A = Goals against
Pts = Points
Pos = Final position

TL = Thai League 1

QR1 = First Qualifying Round
QR2 = Second Qualifying Round
QR3 = Third Qualifying Round
QR4 = Fourth Qualifying Round
RInt = Intermediate Round
R1 = Round 1
R2 = Round 2
R3 = Round 3

R4 = Round 4
R5 = Round 5
R6 = Round 6
GR = Group stage
QF = Quarter-finals
SF = Semi-finals
RU = Runners-up
S = Shared
W = Winners

Note
The list below shows the different names used to represent the same level of competition.
Level 1 : (Johny Walker) Thailand Soccer League, (Caltex) Premier League, (GSM) Thai League, Thailand Premier League, and (Sponsor) Thai Premier League
Level 2 : Thailand Division 1 League and Thai Division 1 League

Performance in AFC competitions

Coaches

Coaches by Years (2008–present)

Honours

Domestic competitions
 Thai League 1
 Champions (1): 1998
 Runner-up (1): 1997
 Thai Division 1 League
 Runner-up (1): 2007
 3rd Place (1): 2011
 Regional League Division 2
 Champions (1): 2006
 Thai FA Cup
 Winners (1): 1997
 Kor Royal Cup
 Winners (2): 1997, 1998
 3rd Place (1): 1995
 Queen's Cup
 Runner-up (3): 1999, 2000, 2002

International competitions
 Asian Club Championship
 Quarter-final (1): 1999
 Asian Cup Winners' Cup
 Second round (1): 1998

References

External links
 Official Website 
 BBCU at Thai Premier League

 
Defunct football clubs in Thailand
Association football clubs established in 1976
Association football clubs disestablished in 2017
Thai League 1 clubs
Thai FA Cup winners
Football clubs in Bangkok
Sport in Bangkok
1976 establishments in Thailand
2017 disestablishments in Thailand